Hilmar Hoßfeld (born 18 January 1954) is a German athlete. He competed in the men's discus throw at the 1980 Summer Olympics.

References

1954 births
Living people
Athletes (track and field) at the 1980 Summer Olympics
German male discus throwers
Olympic athletes of East Germany
Place of birth missing (living people)